Siganus stellatus, the brown-spotted spinefoot, brown-spotted rabbitfish, honeycomb rabbitfish, starspotted spinefoot, starspotted rabbitfish or stellate rabbitfish  is a species of marine ray-finned fish, a rabbitfish belonging to the family Siganidae. It is found in the Indo-Pacific region.

Taxonomy
Siganus stellatus was first formally described in 1775 as Scarus stellatus by the Swedish-speaking Finnish explorer and naturalist Peter Forsskål with the type locality given as Jeddah in modern Saudi Arabia. Forsskål's description was published posthumously by, Carsten Niebuhr, a fellow member and only survivor of the Danish Arabia expedition (1761–67), in his Descriptiones animalium avium, amphibiorum, piscium, insectorum, vermium; quae in itinere orientali observavit Petrus Forskål. Post mortem auctoris edidit Carsten Niebuhr. The specific name stellatus means “ covered with stars”, this is thought to be a reference to the small, closely set, dark brown to black hexagonal spots which cover the body and the caudal fin.

Subspecies
Siganus stellatus has two recognised subspecies which are:

 Siganus stellatus stellatus (Forsskål, 1775) - Red Sea, Indian Ocean and Western Pacific Ocean
 Siganus stellatus laqueus von Bonde, 1934 - Red Sea and the Indian Ocean

However, these subspecies are sympatric over the Indian Ocean and other authorities consider that laqueus is a valid species. If accepted Siganus laqueus was first formally described in 1934 by the South African zoologist, fisheries scientist and oceanographer Cecil von Bonde with its type locality given as the west coast of Zanzibar. The specific name laqueus means “trap” or “snare”, in Swahili this fish is called chafi uzia which means “fish trap” as it is often caught using fish traps.

Description
Siganus stellatus has a deep and laterally compressed body which has a depth which fits 2 to 2.3 times into its standard length. The dorsal profile of the head is almost a straight line and has an angle of around 45° between the forehead and the snout while the ventral profile of the head has a slight indentation under the chin. In juveniles the front nostril has a long triangular flap but this is reduced to a low rim in adults. There is a recumbent spine to the front of the dorsal fin. Like all rabbitfishes, the dorsal fin has 13 spines and 10 soft rays while the anal fin has 7 spines and 9 soft rays. The fin spines hold venom glands. The caudal fin is emarginate but slowly becomes deeply forked as the fish grows. The body is covered in small closely set dark brown to black spots separated by a white background creating a "honeycomb pattern", there are black spots on the fins while the caudal fin and the rear edges of dorsal and anal fins have a whitish margin, They frequently show a light, whitish to yellowish saddle mark on the caudal peduncle. In the subspecies S. s. laqueus the background colour of the body is greyish green with the head and the body covered with dark brown spots.

Distribution and habitat
Siganus stellatus is found from the Red Sea south to South Africa and through the Indian Ocean into the Pacific Ocean where it reaches Singapore. In Australian territory it is known only from the Cocos (Keeling) Islands. The juveniles are known to enter weedy estuarine habitats.

Biology
Siganus stellatus grazes on benthic macroalgae. The adults live in pairs while subadults and juveniles form schools. There appears to be some seasonality in the breeding with sudden peaks of numbers of juveniles occurring during summer. This species produces venom in the spines of its fins. In a study of the venom of a congener it was found that rabbitfish venom was similar to the venom of stonefishes.

Fisheries
Siganus stellatus is caught in fish traps in Kenya and Tanzania and with spears throughput its range.

References

Siganidae
Fish described in 1775
Taxa named by Peter Forsskål